Raakhandaar (Marathi: राखानदार) is a 2014 Fiction, Philosophy, Drama Marathi film directed & produced by Mrunalinni Patil. It stars Jitendra Joshi, Anuja Sathe, Ajinkya Deo in lead roles The film was released on 26 September 2014.

Plot
Is a story about faith in God and his existence. Sadanad is poor chap who some how meet his ends by working in a company workshop, he is a happy go lucky kind of a person even after he has been thrown out of his job he keeps his faith and eventually starts his own business. Who help him start his business? How he mate with the love of his life? Will they able to live happily ever after? who is trying to prove his faith wrong?

Synopsis 
Jitendra Joshi deserves kudos for underplaying his role while Ajinkya Deo passes muster as the Khandoba. While Yatin Karyerkar is just about okay, Anuja Sathe scores in her debut role as an actress. Choreography is excellent in the film and the director deserves kudos for the way she has handled the film without boring you.

Though the film is a feel good film, what mars it is the fact that it takes the viewers back to the 70’s when such goody goody tales about how a man succeeds in life thanks to God’s help were popular.

The film has an old world charm about it and will certainly appeal to the families.

Cast
 Ajinkya Deo as Khushaba
 Jitendra Joshi as Sadanand Lokre
 Anuja Sathe As Madhavi
 Yatin Karyekar

Development
The outline of the plot for the movie Rakhandaar runs around the faith that a common man might hold upon the presence of God. Sadanand, the main protagonist, happens to be a poor man. He somehow manages to survive working in the workshops of a company.

The guy managed to live together happily or not. One needs to catch this movie once it arrives to the cinemas on the twenty sixth of September. Probably then, the audience shall gets a chance to introspect and find out the extent to which they hold their faith on God.

The film has got Ajinkya Deo, Anuja sathe, Jitendra Joshi and  Yatin Karyekar in its various important roles. Dr. Mrunalinni Patil had handled two important roles of directing and producing the movie while the story got scripted of the pens of Anand More. Keeping tract with the softness of the movie, the music had been directed by Kanakraj. The music director is optimist of showering the beauty of the devotional essence upon the minds of the audience.

As per the director, this film is all about the ongoing tassels between the ones one trust in existence of God and the others who defy. Indian cinemas had a rich heritage of dealing with films of philosophical genres and the director is optimist to get the name of the film into the list of such names. The fate for this movie shall only depend upon the audience, the god, whose existence had never been questioned by the men from the silver screen.

Soundtrack
The soundtrack of Raakhandaar was composed by Kanakraj.

References

External links
 
 

2014 films
2010s Marathi-language films